Non-motorized access on freeways may allow or restrict pedestrians, bicyclists and other non-motorized traffic to use a freeway. Such roads are public ways intended primarily for high-speed travel over long distances, and they have resulted in highways in the United States with engineering features such as long sight-distances, wide marked lanes and the absence of cross traffic. These provide faster and safer travel, at least for vehicles driving at similar speeds.

Freeways are usually limited to motor vehicles of a minimum power or speed; signs may prohibit bicyclists, pedestrians and equestrians and impose a minimum speed. It is possible for non-motorized traffic to use facilities within the same right-of-way, such as sidewalks constructed along freeway-standard bridges and multi-use paths next to freeways such as the Suncoast Trail along the Suncoast Parkway in Florida.

European Union

In the countries of Western and Northern Europe with relatively high bicycle share like the Netherlands, Denmark, Belgium and Germany, cycling on motorways is not a topic for debate: cycling is not allowed on official motorways, and is generally forbidden with road signs on all similar roads.

In those countries it has no practical use, and effort is put in building an independent cycling network, crossing no entrance and exit ramps of arterial roads and expressways. Some sections of the cycle networks of these countries are adjacent to (but separated from) a motorway, but those are exceptions.

United Kingdom
In countries such as the United Kingdom and Germany, the difference between a normal road and a freeway-class road (motorway or autobahn) is the restriction of low-speed traffic. Many roads are built to freeway standards but are not legally freeway-class roads for this reason. Indeed, some freeway-class roads are downgraded for short stretches where no alternative exists, to allow low-speed traffic; examples in the UK include the Dartford Crossing (the furthest downstream public crossing of the Thames), and the former Cumberland Gap, as well as sections of the A1 not yet designated A1(M), various lengths of the A5, and the entirety of other important and near-motorway-standard links such as the A14, A34, A38, A42, A50, and A55 road, long stretches of which carry  speed limits. The reasons for such designation vary—physical lack of space (A55), restricted budget (e.g. A42; a full-standard motorway would have been more expensive than an A-road; a motorway with additional service roads further still), or because of legislative or political wrangling (easier to have A-road construction or upgrade authorised and accepted than a more emotionally charged "motorway scheme", and does not require issuing of Special Road orders).

United States
In some US jurisdictions, especially where freeways replace existing roads, non-motorized access on freeways is the rule. Different states of the United States have different laws. Cycling on freeways in Arizona may be prohibited only where there is an alternative route judged equal or better for cycling. Wyoming, the least populated state, allows cycling on all freeways. Oregon allows bicycles except on specific urban freeways in Portland and Medford.

Freeway travel eliminates most collision points that are caused by turning or crossing at intersections, save at entrance and exit ramps. An analysis of crashes in Arizona showed no safety problems with cycling on freeways. Fewer than one motor vehicle-bicycle crash a year was recorded in the 1990s on nearly  open to cyclists in Arizona. The study did not attempt to establish how common cyclists are on Arizona freeways or whether they are aware that they can legally cycle on some freeway stretches; accidents were also noted on stretches where cycling was forbidden.

U.S. states permitting bicycle use on interstate highways

Most U.S. States with low population densities commonly permit bicycle use on interstate freeways outside urban areas. Additionally, some states permit bicycle use on at least some interstate routes specially designated to accommodate bikes.

Bike freeways

Bike freeways (also known as cycling highways) are direct, long-distance cycle tracks separated from motorized traffic and with almost no big intersections or delays, intended for utility cycling. In countries like the Netherlands and Belgium (Flanders), they are built connecting city and town centers, e.g. adjacent to railroads.

See also 

 Cycling infrastructure
 Restrictions on motorcycle use on freeways

Notes

References 

Utility cycling
Road transport
Limited-access roads
Controlled-access highways
Bicycle transportation planning